Fleurs, also graphically rendered as Fleur(s) and FLEURs, is a studio album by Italian singer-songwriter Franco Battiato, issued in 1999.  Except for two new songs, the album consists of cover versions of Italian and international classics, mainly from the 1960s. The album was described as "delicate, elegant and enjoyable." The album was followed by Fleurs 3 (2002) and Fleurs 2 (2008). The Battiato's version of The Rolling Stones' "Ruby Tuesday" was later featured in the musical score of Alfonso Cuarón's 2006 film Children of Men.

Track listing
 La canzone dell'amore perduto – 3:26 (Fabrizio De André)
 Ruby Tuesday  – 3:36 (Mick Jagger, Keith Richards)
   J'entends siffler le train – 3:09 (Hedy West, Richard Anthony)
    Aria di neve – 2:52 (Sergio Endrigo)
    Ed io tra di voi – 2:53 (Sergio Bardotti, Charles Aznavour)
    Te lo leggo negli occhi – 3:03 (Sergio Bardotti, Sergio Endrigo)
    La canzone dei vecchi amanti (La chanson des vieux amants) – 3:25 (Jacques Brel)
    Era de maggio – 3:26 (Mario Pasquale Costa, Salvatore Di Giacomo)
    Che cosa resta (Que reste-t-il de nos amour) – 3:27 (Charles Trenet, Gesualdo Bufalino)
    Amore che vieni, amore che vai – 2:27 (Fabrizio De André)
    Medievale – 2:37 (Manlio Sgalambro, Franco Battiato)
   Invito al viaggio – 6:44 (Charles Baudelaire, Manlio Sgalambro, Franco Battiato)

References

1999 albums
Franco Battiato albums
Italian-language albums